Neognomidolon is a genus of beetles in the family Cerambycidae, containing the following species:

 Neognomidolon pereirai (Martins, 1960)
 Neognomidolon poecilum Martins, 1967

References

Ibidionini